Tromsøposten was a Norwegian newspaper, published in Tromsø. It was established in 1872, and ceased publication in 1915. The newspaper had two editors from the start, I Holthe and Paul Steenstrup Koht. Among its later editors were P. Wilh. Pedersen and Carl Moursund.

References

1872 establishments in Norway
1915 disestablishments in Norway
Defunct newspapers published in Norway
Mass media in Tromsø
Newspapers published in Norway
Norwegian-language newspapers
Publications established in 1872
Publications disestablished in 1915